Maximiliano Fornari (born 15 May 1995) is an Argentine professional footballer who plays as a midfielder for Club Cipolletti.

References

External links

1995 births
Living people
Association football midfielders
Argentine footballers
Argentine expatriate footballers
Club Atlético Sarmiento footballers
Ferro Carril Oeste footballers
Olimpo footballers
Club Atlético Los Andes footballers
Mushuc Runa S.C. footballers
Apollon Larissa F.C. players
Club Cipolletti footballers
Argentine Primera División players
Primera Nacional players
Argentine expatriate sportspeople in Ecuador
Argentine expatriate sportspeople in Greece
Expatriate footballers in Ecuador
Expatriate footballers in Greece
People from Salto Partido
Sportspeople from Buenos Aires Province
21st-century Argentine people